Sheila Bunker Nickerson (born 1942) is an American poet and writer. She served as poet laureate of Alaska and was twice awarded the Pushcart Prize. Much of her writing focuses on Alaska, nature, and arctic exploration.

Life and education
Nickerson was born in 1942 in New York City. She is the eldest of three children of Charles Cantine Bunker and Mavis Bunker (née McGuire), and the great niece of diplomat Ellsworth Bunker.

After attending the Chapin School, she went on to Bryn Mawr College, where she majored in English. She also received a Ph.D. in creative writing from the Union Institute and University. She previously lived in Juneau, Alaska, and currently lives in Bellingham, Washington.

Career and work
Nickerson was named poet laureate of Alaska in 1977. She served as writer-in-residence for the State of Alaska Artists-in-the-Schools program, was writer-in-residence at the Alaska State Library, and was co-founder of University Within Walls, a statewide prison education program. She was also editor of Alaska's Wildlife, a magazine published by the State of Alaska Department of Fish & Game.

Nickerson's poems and essays have been published in a number of literary magazines and anthologies. In 1976, she was awarded the Pushcart Prize for the poem "The Song of the Soapstone Carver". In 1986, she was again awarded the Pushcart Prize for the poem "Kodiak Widow".

Her 1996 nonfiction work Disappearance: A Map, is part personal memoir about the loss of a colleague and part nonfiction account of disappearances in Alaska, including Franklin's lost expedition in 1845, polar expeditions of Captain Bob Bartlett and Vilhjalmur Stefansson and more recent vanishings such as those of U.S. Congressmen Nick Begich and Hale Boggs. Nickerson discussed disappearances in Alaska in the "Alaska's Bermuda Triangle" episode of The History Channel's History's Mysteries series.

In 2001 Nickerson was a Harriman scholar participating in The Harriman Expedition Retraced, a voyage sponsored by Smith College and the Public Broadcasting Service following the itinerary of the Harriman Alaska Expedition of 1899. She was interviewed in a 2-hour PBS documentary film about the 2001 expedition.

Published works
Poetry
Hitchhiking the Highway of Tears (Moonpath Press, 2017) 
Along the Alaska Highway (Sheltering Pines Press, 2009)
In an August Garden (Black Spruce Press, 1997) 
Feast of the Animals: An Alaska Bestiary, Vol. II (with engravings by Dale DeArmond, Old Harbor Press, 1991) 
In the Compass of Unrest (Trout Creek Press, 1988) 
Feast of the Animals: An Alaska Bestiary, Vol. I (with engravings by Dale DeArmond, Old Harbor Press, 1987) 
On Why the Quilt-Maker Became a Dragon (Vanessapress, 1985) 
Waiting for the News of Death (Bits Press, 1982)
Songs of the Pine Wife (Copper Canyon Press, 1980) 
To the Waters and the Wild: Poems of Alaska (Thorp Springs Press, 1975) 
Letter from Alaska and Other Poems (Thorp Springs Press, 1972)

Fiction
In Rooms of Falling Rain (Thorp Springs Press, 1976) 

Nonfiction
Blackbird Flying, a memoir (Fuze Publishing, 2019) 
Harnessed to the Pole: Sledge Dogs in Service to American Explorers of the Arctic 1853-1909 (University of Alaska Press, 2014) 
Midnight to the North: The Untold Story of the Inuit Woman Who Saved the Polaris Expedition (Tarcher/Penguin Putnam, 2002) 
Disappearance: A Map (Doubleday, 1996) 
Writers in the Public Library (The Shoe String Press, 1984)

References

External links
 Works by or about Sheila Nickerson in libraries (WorldCat catalog)

Living people
1942 births
Poets Laureate of Alaska
People from Juneau, Alaska
American women poets
Poets from Alaska
Chapin School (Manhattan) alumni
Bryn Mawr College alumni
21st-century American women